The dory or doru  is a spear that was the chief spear of hoplites (heavy infantry) in Ancient Greece. The word "dory was first attested by Homer with the meanings of "wood" and "spear". Homeric heroes hold two  (plural of ) (Il. 11,43, Od. 1, 256). In the Homeric epics and in the classical period the dory was a symbol of military power, possibly more important than the sword, as can be inferred from expressions like "Troy conquered by dory" (Il. 16,708) and words like " (spear-won) and " (spear-taken).

The spear used by the Persian army under Darius I and Xerxes in their respective campaigns during the Greco-Persian Wars was shorter than that of their Greek opponents. The dorys length enabled multiple ranks of a formation to engage simultaneously during combat.

The dory was not a javelin. However, its aerodynamic shape allowed the dory to be thrown. Because it had evolved for combat between phalanges (the plural form of phalanx), it was constructed so as to be adequate against the defences of Greek infantry, which incorporated bronze in shield and helmet construction. Hoplites were generally more heavily armored than infantry of their non-Greek contemporaries.

Should not be confused with Dorydrepanon (δορυδρέπανον, from δόρυ (Dory) + δρέπανον (Sickle)) which was a kind of Halberd and was used for cutting off halyards in sea-fights and for pulling down battlements in sieges.

Details
The flat leaf-shaped spearhead was composed of iron and its weight was counterbalanced by an iron butt-spike. (cf Sarissa)

The point part of the spear was called αἰχμή and ἀκωκή and λόγχη.

It was also called ouriachos (οὐρίαχος) and styrax (στύραξ) or styrakion (στυράκιον).
It functionally served as a counter-weight to give balance. This spike had several uses. It could be used to stand the spear up or used as a secondary weapon if the spearhead was broken off. If the shaft of the dory was broken or if the iron point was lost, the remaining portion could still function. Though its combat range would be reduced, the dorys complete length would have lessened the chance of a single break rendering it ineffective. Additionally, any enemies that had fallen could be dispatched by the warriors marching over them in the back ranks of the phalanx who were holding their spears in a vertical position.

A dory was kept in a case which was called δορατοθήκη or δουροδοθήκη or δουροθήκη or δοροθήκη (meaning "dory case") and δουροδόκη or δορυδόκη (meaning "dory rack"). Homer called it σύριγξ, meaning pipe because of the form of the case.

See also
 Xyston

References

Ancient Greek military equipment
Ancient Greek military terminology
Polearms